Ashit (Äşit) is a rural locality (a village) in Novonagayevsky Selsoviet, Krasnokamsky District, Bashkortostan, Russia. The population was 71 as of 2010. There are 3 streets.

Geography 
Ashit is located 33 km south of Nikolo-Beryozovka (the district's administrative centre) by road. Ivanovka is the nearest rural locality.

References 

Rural localities in Krasnokamsky District